Trine Rein is an American-Norwegian singer. Her album sales have exceeded more than a million records. She was born in San Francisco in 1970, and is married to Norwegian adventurer Lars Monsen.

Biography

Debut
Trine Rein released her first solo album in 1993, Finders, Keepers. It peaked at the top of the Norwegian album chart for five weeks. But as she was almost unknown before the release, it took her 14 weeks to finally be the most popular album in Norway. And due to the extensive foreign press coverage of the Olympic Winter Games in Lillehammer February 1994, her album was soon a hit in Japan as well. At one time she topped 16 different Japanese radio station charts simultaneously. Due to this popularity and interest on the Japanese isles, almost two-thirds of the more than 600,000 albums sold of her first album were bought by Japanese fans.

Rein has released two successful singles. The first came with her debut album, called "Just Missed the Train", and has become Rein's trademark song, exposing her great singing ability. The song has later been covered by child star actress Danielle Brisebois (who wrote the song with Scott Cutler), Estonian Eurovision participant Maarja-Liis Ilus, American Idol winner Kelly Clarkson, and a pre-American Idol Carly Hennessy (a.k.a. Carly Smithson), among others.

Declining sales
Her second album came in 1996, called Beneath My Skin, and also enjoyed some success, though only selling about half the number of copies as her debut album did. More than 300,000 copies were sold in Norway, Japan, and Denmark, which was a new market for Rein. In its first release week, the album went straight to number one in Norwegian albums chart. Again a popular single was released in 1996, this time her cover of the alternative rock band Ednaswap's song "Torn", which later, in 1997 got its worldwide fame with the Natalie Imbruglia cover, with one of the most broadcast music videos of that time on music channel MTV.

Moving abroad
Her third album To Find The Truth was released in 1998, and sold about 100 000 copies. Shortly afterwards, she decided she had got enough of the celebrity life, and searched anonymous refugee existence abroad for a few years. In 2000, Rein settled permanently in San Francisco and Los Angeles where she had a variety of odd jobs, including being a limo driver.

She finally moved back to Norway in 2004 and decided to make a comeback to the music scene. She managed two projects simultaneously; firstly she starred in a summer show called "80-tallet beat for beat" with three other artists. She also released her first compilation CD, entitled The Very Best of Trine Rein the same year.

Eurovision ambitions
Rein years ago stated that she would never participate in the Norwegian final and selection method for the Eurovision Song Contest, the so-called Melodi Grand Prix. Rein decided to leave all disputed comments to the past and figured the time was finally right when she was asked by the Norwegian Broadcasting (NRK) to participate in 2006.

On January 13, 2006, Rein entered the stage in Alta to become the first artist to illuminate the northernmost national Eurovision selection in the history of the European contest, and the televoters would send her to Oslo Spektrum and the final of Melodi Grand Prix 2006. Rein's composition, "Here for the Show", was written by three experienced Swedish producers/songwriters, and was criticized for having similarities to Robbie Williams's "Let Me Entertain You", which the authors also admitted had been their sole inspiration. The song did not qualify for the international finals though.

She has recorded "Time After Time" with the Danish singer Flemming "Bamse" Jørgensen.

New album and single in 2010
On May 18, 2010, Rein premiered her first single in twelve years titled "I Found Love" on her official website, and it became available for digital purchase on May 24.  Rein's new album (her fourth record to date) was called Seeds of Joy, and was released on September 20, 2010.

Personal life

Rein is a vegan and advocate for animal rights.

Discography

Singles
 "Just Missed The Train" (1993) No. 4 in Norway
 "Stay With Me Baby" (1994)
 "Torn" (1996) No. 10 in Norway
 "Do You Really Wanna Leave Me This Way" (1996)
 "The State I'm In" (1996)
 "Never Far Away" (1996)
 "World Without You" (1998)
 "Stars And Angels" (1998)
 "I Found Love" (2010)
 "Når Klokkene Slår" (2011)
 "If You're Next to Me" (2012)
 "Closer" (2014)
 "Den Første Julenatt" (2015)
 "Don't Say It's Over" (2016)
 "Hello It's Me" (2016)
 "Julegaven" (2017)
 "Where Do We Go" (featuring Ole Børud) (2019)

Albums
 Finders, Keepers (1993) No. 1 in Norway
 Beneath My Skin (1996) No. 1 in Norway
 To Find The Truth (1998) No. 22 in Norway
 Seeds of Joy (September 20, 2010) No. 19 in Norway
 The Well (January 27, 2017)

Compilations
 The Very Best of Trine Rein (2004)

See also
 Melodi Grand Prix 2006
 Melodi Grand Prix 2007

References

External links
Official website

1970 births
Living people
American people of Norwegian descent
Melodi Grand Prix contestants
American women pop singers
21st-century Norwegian singers
21st-century Norwegian women singers
21st-century American women